Clabby ( is a small village in County Fermanagh, Northern Ireland. It is 3 miles (5 km) north-west of Fivemiletown and 4 miles (6 km) north-east of Tempo, close to the County Tyrone boundary. The 2001 Census recorded a population of 198. It is situated within Fermanagh and Omagh district.

References

External links
NI Neighbourhood Information Service

Villages in County Fermanagh
Fermanagh and Omagh district